Charles Addison Bouman Jr. is the Showalter Professor of Electrical and Computer Engineering and Biomedical Engineering at Purdue University, where he has taught since 1989. His research focuses on applications of image processing in various contexts, including medicine, materials science, and consumer imaging. His work led to the development of the first commercial CT scan technology to use model-based iterative reconstruction. He is a co-inventor on over fifty patents in the field of consumer imaging. He is a member of the National Academy of Inventors, as well as a fellow of the Institute of Electrical and Electronics Engineers, the American Institute for Medical and Biological Engineering, the Society for Imaging Science and Technology, and SPIE. He was formerly the editor-in-chief of IEEE Transactions on Image Processing.

He is the father of computational imaging scientist Katie Bouman.

Fusing Sensor Models with Machine Learning Models 
Bouman is the lead author of what has been described as a
"Plug-n-Play" method for fusing sensor models and
machine-learning models for joint optimization of the two
for the generation of images from noisy and incomplete
projection data.

References

External links
Faculty profile

American electrical engineers
Living people
University of Pennsylvania alumni
University of California, Berkeley alumni
Princeton University alumni
Computer engineers
Purdue University faculty
Fellow Members of the IEEE
Fellows of the American Institute for Medical and Biological Engineering
Fellows of SPIE
Year of birth missing (living people)
21st-century American engineers